Mercurie Ivanov (born 24 August 1938) is a Romanian sprint canoer who competed in the early 1960s. He was eliminated in the semifinals of the K-2 1000 m event at the 1960 Summer Olympics in Rome.

References
Sports-reference.com profile

1938 births
Canoeists at the 1960 Summer Olympics
Living people
Olympic canoeists of Romania
Romanian male canoeists
Place of birth missing (living people)